Baragowah is a village in Pakistan, west of the city of Jhelum, on Potohar Plateau.
Famous people from Baragowah "Teacher Syed Ghulam Shabbir shah"

Well known personalities are: 
Muhammad Ilyas Kiyani
Mazhar Hussain Kiyani
Jehanzaib Ilyas Kiyani

References 
ڈھوک عزیز اللہ

External links 
 Entry at Wikimapia

Populated places in Jhelum District